Ion Ibric (born 27 May 1974) is a Romanian former professional footballer who played as a defender for teams such as: CSM Reșița, Liberty Salonta and FC Sopron. After retirement, he was for a short period the manager of FC Caransebeș.

Honours
CSM Reșița
Divizia B: 1996–97

References

External links
 
 
 Ion Ibric at magyarfutball.hu

1974 births
Living people
Sportspeople from Pitești
Romanian footballers
Association football defenders
Liga I players
Liga II players
CSM Reșița players
CF Liberty Oradea players
Nemzeti Bajnokság I players
FC Sopron players
Romanian expatriate footballers
Romanian expatriate sportspeople in Hungary
Expatriate footballers in Hungary
Romanian football managers